Steffin McCarter (born January 19, 1997) is an American track and field athlete who competes in the long jump.  McCarter competed in the long jump at the 2019 World Championships in Athletics where he advanced to the finals.  He was originally an alternate for the competition and earned his world championship berth after national champion Will Claye decided not to compete.

He represented the United States at the 2020 Summer Olympics.

References

External links

1997 births
Living people
American male long jumpers
World Athletics Championships athletes for the United States
Texas Longhorns men's track and field athletes
Sportspeople from Texas
People from Copperas Cove, Texas
Athletes (track and field) at the 2020 Summer Olympics
Olympic track and field athletes of the United States